Nightqueen is a Belgian symphonic metal/power metal band. The band was formed in 2004, and has released 3 albums as of 2019. The group is currently signed with El Puerto Records.

Members
Hellen Heart - vocals
Gio Zuccari - keyboards
Rex Zeco - guitars and backing vocals
Cosi Matrigiani guitars
Paddy Lee bass
Andy Herman - drums

Discography
Inauguration (EP, 2010)
For Queen and Metal (2012)
rEVOLUTION (2014)
’’Seduction’’ (2019)

External links
www.facebook.com/nightqueenmetal

Belgian symphonic metal musical groups
Musical groups established in 2004
2004 establishments in Belgium